The 1995–96 NBA season was the Hawks' 47th season in the National Basketball Association, and 28th season in Atlanta. In the off-season, the Hawks re-acquired former guard and one-time Slam Dunk champion Spud Webb from the Sacramento Kings. The team also replaced Stacey Augmon as the team's starting small forward with Ken Norman, as Augmon played a sixth man role off the bench for the first half of the season. The Hawks played above .500 with a 9–5 start in November, but then struggled losing 10 of their 14 games in December. After 28 games, Norman was benched as Augmon returned to the lineup for the remainder of the season, as the Hawks posted a ten-game winning streak in January, and held a 26–21 record at the All-Star break. At midseason, Webb was traded along with Andrew Lang to the Minnesota Timberwolves in exchange for Christian Laettner and Sean Rooks. The Hawks finished fourth in the Central Division with a 46–36 record.

Head coach Lenny Wilkens reached a significant milestone, becoming the first NBA coach ever to reach 1,000 victories, after a 74–68 home win against his former team, the Cleveland Cavaliers on March 1, 1996; Wilkens also finished in sixth place in Coach of the Year voting. Steve Smith led the Hawks in scoring averaging 18.1 points per game, while Mookie Blaylock averaged 15.7 points, 5.9 assists and 2.6 steals per game, while finishing third in the league with 231 three-point field goals, which was a franchise record for the team, and was named to the NBA All-Defensive Second Team. In addition, Grant Long provided the team with 13.1 points, 9.6 rebounds and 1.3 steals per game, while Augmon provided with 12.7 points and 1.4 steals per game. Off the bench, sixth man Craig Ehlo contributed 8.5 points per game, and top draft pick Alan Henderson averaged 6.4 points and 4.5 rebounds per game. Norman averaged 8.9 points and 3.9 rebounds per game in 34 games, but did not participate in the playoffs, and feuded with coach Wilkens after being benched.

In the Eastern Conference First Round of the playoffs, the Hawks faced the Indiana Pacers for the third consecutive season. They would eliminate the 3rd-seeded Pacers in a hard fought five-game series. However, in the Eastern Conference Semi-finals, they would be eliminated by the Orlando Magic in five games. Following the season, Augmon and Long were both traded to the Detroit Pistons, while Ehlo signed as a free agent with the Seattle SuperSonics, and Rooks signed with the Los Angeles Lakers.

For the season, the Hawks changed their primary logo, which showed a hawk spreading its wings and holding a basketball, and added black and brown to their color scheme of red and yellow. The team also added new uniforms, which had the Hawks' logo on the front of their jerseys, while adding half-black and half-red road uniforms. The logo remained in use until 2007, while the basic design lasted until 2015, and the new uniforms lasted until 1999.

Offseason

Draft picks

Roster

Regular season

Season standings

Record vs. opponents

Game log

|- align="center" bgcolor="ffcccc"
|| 1 || November 3 || Indiana Pacers || L 106-111|| || Omni Coliseum || 0-1
|- align="center" bgcolor="ccffcc"
|| 2 || November 4 || Orlando Magic || W 124-91|| || Omni Coliseum || 1-1
|- align="center" bgcolor="ffcccc"
|| 3 || November 6 || @ Utah Jazz || L 96-105|| || Delta Center || 1-2
|- align="center" bgcolor="ccffcc"
|| 4 || November 8 || @ Los Angeles Clippers || W 100-92|| || Los Angeles Memorial Sports Arena || 2-2
|- align="center" bgcolor="ccffcc"
|| 5 || November 9 || @ Golden State Warriors || W 125-121|| || Oakland Coliseum Arena || 3-2
|- align="center" bgcolor="ccffcc"
|| 6 || November 11 || @ Dallas Mavericks || W 113-100|| || Reunion Arena || 4-2
|- align="center" bgcolor="ccffcc"
|| 7 || November 14 || Charlotte Hornets || W 111-104|| || Omni Coliseum || 5-2
|- align="center" bgcolor="ffcccc"
|| 8 || November 17 || Miami Heat || L 88-91|| || Omni Coliseum || 5-3
|- align="center" bgcolor="ccffcc"
|| 9 || November 19 || @ Sacramento Kings || W 108-94|| || ARCO Arena || 6-3
|- align="center" bgcolor="ffcccc"
|| 10 || November 21 || @ Denver Nuggets || L 99-107|| || McNichols Sports Arena || 6-4
|- align="center" bgcolor="ffcccc"
|| 11 || November 22 || @ Phoenix Suns || L 112-117|| || America West Arena || 6-5
|- align="center" bgcolor="ccffcc"
|| 12 || November 25 || Toronto Raptors || W 114-102|| || Omni Coliseum || 7-5
|- align="center" bgcolor="ccffcc"
|| 13 || November 28 || @ New York Knicks || W 102-97 (OT)|| || Madison Square Garden || 8-5
|- align="center" bgcolor="ccffcc"
|| 14 || November 29 || Philadelphia 76ers || W 106-81|| || Omni Coliseum || 9-5
|-

|- align="center" bgcolor="ffcccc"
|| 15 || December 1 || Dallas Mavericks || L 98-106 || || Omni Coliseum || 9-6
|-
|- align="center" bgcolor="ffcccc"
|| 16 || December 2 || @ Detroit Pistons || L 96-104 || || The Palace Of Auburn Hills || 9-7
|-
|- align="center" bgcolor="ffcccc"
|| 17 || December 6 || @ Washington Bullets || L 79-96 || || US Airways Arena || 9-8
|-
|- align="center" bgcolor="ffcccc"
|| 18 || December 7 || San Antonio Spurs || L 102-104 || || Omni Coliseum || 9-9
|-
|- align="center" bgcolor="ffcccc"
|| 19 || December 9 || New York Knicks || L 92-101 || || Omni Coliseum || 9-10
|-
|- align="center" bgcolor="ccffcc"
|| 20 || December || @ Boston Celtics || W 108-103 || || Fleet Center || 10-10
|-
|- align="center" bgcolor="ffcccc"
|| 21 || December 12 || Minnesota Timberwolves || L 78-85 || || Omni Coliseum || 10-11
|-
|- align="center" bgcolor="ffcccc"
|| 22 || December 14 || Chicago Bulls || L 108-127 || || Omni Coliseum || 10-12
|-
|- align="center" bgcolor="ccffcc"
|| 23 || December 16 || Denver Nuggets || W 95-86 || || Omni Coliseum || 11-12
|-
|- align="center" bgcolor="ccffcc"
|| 24 || December 22 || New Jersey Nets || W 94-91 || || Omni Coliseum || 12-12
|-
|- align="center" bgcolor="ffcccc"
|| 25 || December 23 || @ Milwaukee Bucks || L 111-115 || || Bradley Center || 12-13
|-
|- align="center" bgcolor="ccffcc"
|| 26 || December 26 || Los Angeles Clippers || W 94-88 || || Omni Coliseum || 13-13
|-
|- align="center" bgcolor="ffcccc"
|| 27 || December 29 || Golden State Warriors || L 96-117 || || Omni Coliseum || 13-14
|-
|- align="center" bgcolor="ffcccc"
|| 28 || December 30 || @ Chicago Bulls || L 93-95 || || United Center || 13-15
|-

|- align="center" bgcolor="ffcccc"
|| 29 || January 2 || Seattle SuperSonics || L 88-111 || || Omni Coliseum || 13-16
|-
|- align="center" bgcolor="ccffcc"
|| 30 || January 4 || Toronto Raptors || W 104-101 (OT) || || Omni Coliseum || 14-16
|-
|- align="center" bgcolor="ffcccc"
|| 31 || January 6 || @ Charlotte Hornets || L 90-96 || || Charlotte Coliseum || 14-17
|-
|- align="center" bgcolor="ccffcc"
|| 32 || January 9 || Sacramento Kings || W 104-88 || || Omni Coliseum || 15-17
|-
|- align="center" bgcolor="ccffcc"
|| 33 || January 11 || @ Toronto Raptors || W 87-79 || || SkyDome || 16-17
|-
|- align="center" bgcolor="ccffcc"
|| 34 || January 13 || Boston Celtics || W 108-105 || || Omni Coliseum || 17-17
|-
|- align="center" bgcolor="ccffcc"
|| 35 || January 15 || Detroit Pistons || W 96-88 || || Omni Coliseum || 18-17
|-
|- align="center" bgcolor="ccffcc"
|| 36 || January 17 || Indiana Pacers || W 102-93 || || Omni Coliseum || 19-17
|-
|- align="center" bgcolor="ccffcc"
|| 37 || January 19 || @ Philadelphia 76ers || W 82-77 || || Spectrum || 20-17
|-
|- align="center" bgcolor="ccffcc"
|| 38 || January 20 || Miami Heat || W 98-78 || || Omni Coliseum || 21-17
|-
|- align="center" bgcolor="ccffcc"
|| 39 || January 22 || Houston Rockets || W 105-96 || || Omni Coliseum || 22-17
|-
|- align="center" bgcolor="ccffcc"
|| 40 || January 23 || @ Cleveland Cavaliers || W 84-72 || || Gund Arena || 23-17
|-
|- align="center" bgcolor="ccffcc"
|| 41 || January 26 || Orlando Magic || W 96-84 || || Omni Coliseum || 24-17
|-
|- align="center" bgcolor="ffcccc"
|| 42 || January 30 || @ Indiana Pacers || L 90-107 || || Market Square Arena || 24-18
|-
|- align="center" bgcolor="ffcccc"
|| 43 || January 31 || Phoenix Suns || L 84-120 || || Omni Coliseum || 24-19
|-

|- align="center" bgcolor="ffcccc"
|| 44 || February 2 || @ Orlando Magic || L 95-108 || || Orlando Arena || 24-20
|-
|- align="center" bgcolor="ccffcc"
|| 45 || February 4 || Charlotte Hornets || W 106-104 || || Omni Coliseum || 25-20
|-
|- align="center" bgcolor="ffcccc"
|| 46 || February 7 || @ Miami Heat || L 89-101 || || Miami Arena || 25-21
|-
|- align="center" bgcolor="ccffcc"
|| 47 || February 8 || Washington Bullets || W 98-92 || || Omni Coliseum || 26-21
|-
|- align="center" bgcolor="ffcccc"
|| 48 || February 14 || @ Los Angeles Lakers || L 86-87 || || Great Western Forum || 26-22
|-
|- align="center" bgcolor="ccffcc"
|| 49 || February 16 || @ Vancouver Grizzlies || W 110-100 || || General Motors Place || 27-22
|-
|- align="center" bgcolor="ccffcc"
|| 50 || February 18 || @ Portland Trail Blazers || W 93-90 || || Rose Garden Arena || 28-22
|-
|- align="center" bgcolor="ffcccc"
|| 51 || February 19 || @ Seattle SuperSonics || L 94-102 || || KeyArena at Seattle Center || 28-23
|-
|- align="center" bgcolor="ffcccc"
|| 52 || February 22 || Chicago Bulls || L 91-96 || || Omni Coliseum || 28-24
|-
|- align="center" bgcolor="ccffcc"
|| 53 || February 23 || @ New York Knicks || W 108-97 || || Madison Square Garden || 29-24
|-
|- align="center" bgcolor="ccffcc"
|| 54 || February 25 || @ Minnesota Timberwolves || W 92-76 || || Target Center || 30-24
|-
|- align="center" bgcolor="ccffcc"
|| 55 || February 28 || Portland Trail Blazers || W 90-88 || || Omni Coliseum || 31-24
|-

|- align="center" bgcolor="ccffcc"
|| 56 || March 1 || Cleveland Cavaliers || W 74-68 || || Omni Coliseum || 32-24
|-
|- align="center" bgcolor="ffcccc"
|| 57 || March 2 || @ Milwaukee Bucks || L 106-110 || || Bradley Center || 32-25
|-
|- align="center" bgcolor="ffcccc"
|| 58 || March 4 || @ Detroit Pistons || L 93-99 || || The Palace Of Auburn Hills || 32-26
|-
|- align="center" bgcolor="ccffcc"
|| 59 || March 7 || @ Cleveland Cavaliers || W 83-72 || || Gund Arena || 33-26
|-
|- align="center" bgcolor="ccffcc"
|| 60 || March 8 || Milwaukee Bucks || W 94-91 || || Omni Coliseum || 34-26
|-
|- align="center" bgcolor="ffcccc"
|| 61 || March 10 || @ Washington Bullets || L 91-99 || || US Airways Arena || 34-27
|-
|- align="center" bgcolor="ccffcc"
|| 62 || March 12 || Utah Jazz || W 115-89 || || Omni Coliseum || 35-27
|-
|- align="center" bgcolor="ffcccc"
|| 63 || March 14 || @ Houston Rockets || L 106-114 || || The Summit || 35-28
|-
|- align="center" bgcolor="ffcccc"
|| 64 || March 16 || @ San Antonio Spurs || L 92-119 || || Alamodome || 35-29
|-
|- align="center" bgcolor="ccffcc"
|| 65 || March 20 || Vancouver Grizzlies || W 98-93 || || Omni Coliseum || 36-29
|-
|- align="center" bgcolor="ccffcc"
|| 66 || March 22 || @ Charlotte Hornets || W 117-92 || || Charlotte Coliseum || 37-29
|-
|- align="center" bgcolor="ccffcc"
|| 67 || March 23 || Detroit Pistons || W 92-84 || || Omni Coliseum || 38-29
|-
|- align="center" bgcolor="ccffcc"
|| 68 || March 26 || @ Toronto Raptors || W 114-111 || || SkyDome || 39-29
|-
|- align="center" bgcolor="ffcccc"
|| 69 || March 28 || @ Chicago Bulls || L 80-111 || || United Center || 39-30
|-
|- align="center" bgcolor="ffcccc"
|| 70 || March 29 || Los Angeles Lakers || L 89-102 || || Omni Coliseum || 39-31
|-
|- align="center" bgcolor="ccffcc"
|| 71 || March 31 || @ Boston Celtics || W 93-92 || || Fleet Center || 40-31
|-

|- align="center" bgcolor="ccffcc"
|| 72 || April 2 || Boston Celtics || W 109-89 || || Omni Coliseum || 41-31
|-
|- align="center" bgcolor="ffcccc"
|| 73 || April 4 || Washington Bullets || L 110-113 || || Omni Coliseum || 41-32
|-
|- align="center" bgcolor="ccffcc"
|| 74 || April 5 || @ New Jersey Nets || W 82-70 || || Brendan Byrne Arena || 42-32
|-
|- align="center" bgcolor="ffcccc"
|| 75 || April 6 || Philadelphia 76ers || L 99-100 || || Omni Coliseum || 42-33
|-
|- align="center" bgcolor="ffcccc"
|| 76 || April 8 || @ Indiana Pacers || L 95-97 || || Market Square Arena || 42-34
|-
|- align="center" bgcolor="ccffcc"
|| 77 || April 12 || Milwaukee Bucks || W 104-97 || || Omni Coliseum || 43-34
|-
|- align="center" bgcolor="ccffcc"
|| 78 || April 14 || @ New Jersey Nets || W 99-90 || || Brendan Byrne Arena || 44-34
|-
|- align="center" bgcolor="ffcccc"
|| 79 || April 16 || Cleveland Cavaliers || L 77-80 || || Omni Coliseum || 44-35
|-
|- align="center" bgcolor="ffcccc"
|| 80 || April 18 || @ Orlando Magic || L 104-119 || || Orlando Arena || 44-36
|-
|- align="center" bgcolor="ccffcc"
|| 81 || April 20 || New Jersey Nets || W 121-99 || || Omni Coliseum || 45-36
|-
|- align="center" bgcolor="ccffcc"
|| 82 || April 21 || @ Miami Heat || W 104-92 || || Miami Arena || 46-36
|-

Playoffs

|- align="center" bgcolor="#ccffcc"
| 1
| April 25
| @ Indiana
| W 92–80
| Steve Smith (27)
| Grant Long (14)
| Mookie Blaylock (9)
| Market Square Arena16,438
| 1–0
|- align="center" bgcolor="#ffcccc"
| 2
| April 27
| @ Indiana
| L 94–102 (OT)
| Steve Smith (25)
| Christian Laettner (9)
| Mookie Blaylock (7)
| Market Square Arena16,709
| 1–1
|- align="center" bgcolor="#ccffcc"
| 3
| April 29
| Indiana
| W 90–83
| Steve Smith (26)
| Christian Laettner (8)
| Mookie Blaylock (7)
| Omni Coliseum11,290
| 2–1
|- align="center" bgcolor="#ffcccc"
| 4
| May 2
| Indiana
| L 75–83
| Steve Smith (19)
| Grant Long (12)
| Mookie Blaylock (5)
| Omni Coliseum15,482
| 2–2
|- align="center" bgcolor="#ccffcc"
| 5
| May 5
| @ Indiana
| W 89–87
| Mookie Blaylock (23)
| Christian Laettner (11)
| three players tied (3)
| Market Square Arena16,731
| 3–2
|-

|- align="center" bgcolor="#ffcccc"
| 1
| May 8
| @ Orlando
| L 105–117
| Stacey Augmon (23)
| Alan Henderson (8)
| Steve Smith (9)
| Orlando Arena17,248
| 0–1
|- align="center" bgcolor="#ffcccc"
| 2
| May 10
| @ Orlando
| L 94–120
| Mookie Blaylock (25)
| Christian Laettner (6)
| Steve Smith (5)
| Orlando Arena17,248
| 0–2
|- align="center" bgcolor="#ffcccc"
| 3
| May 12
| Orlando
| L 96–103
| Christian Laettner (26)
| Grant Long (13)
| Mookie Blaylock (8)
| Omni Coliseum15,476
| 0–3
|- align="center" bgcolor="#ccffcc"
| 4
| May 13
| Orlando
| W 104–99
| Steve Smith (35)
| Grant Long (7)
| Mookie Blaylock (11)
| Omni Coliseum12,645
| 1–3
|- align="center" bgcolor="#ffcccc"
| 5
| May 15
| @ Orlando
| L 88–96
| Grant Long (24)
| Grant Long (13)
| Mookie Blaylock (7)
| Orlando Arena17,248
| 1–4
|-

Player statistics

Season

Playoffs

Awards and records

Awards
 Mookie Blaylock, NBA All-Defensive Second Team

Records

Transactions

Trades
February 22, 1996
 Traded Andrew Lang and Spud Webb to the Minnesota Timberwolves for Christian Laettner and Sean Rooks.

Free agents
October 5, 1995
 Signed Howard Nathan as a free agent.
 Signed Matt Bullard as a free agent.

October 30, 1995
 Signed Todd Mundt as a free agent.
 Waived Cuonzo Martin.
 Waived Gaylon Nickerson.

December 14, 1995
 Signed Tim Kempton as a free agent.
 Waived Howard Nathan.

January 5, 1996
 Waived Tim Kempton.

January 16, 1996
 Signed Ron Grandison as a free agent.

February 22, 1996
 Signed Howard Nathan to a 10-day contract.

March 2, 1996
 Waived Howard Nathan.

March 6, 1996
 Signed Reggie Jordan to the first of two 10-day contracts.

March 9, 1996
 Waived Todd Mundt.

March 26, 1996
 Signed Reggie Jordan to a contract for the rest of the season.

Additions

Subtractions

Player Transactions Citation:

See also
 1995–96 NBA season

References

Atlanta Hawks seasons
Atlanta Haw
Atlanta Haw
Atlanta Hawks